Brachylomia sierra is a moth in the family Noctuidae, native to North America. The species was first described by James T. Troubridge and J. Donald Lafontaine in 2007.

The MONA or Hodges number for Brachylomia sierra is 9997.1.

References

Further reading

 
 
 
 

Brachylomia
Moths described in 2007